Ezequiel Mendonca Canário (born 10 April 1960) is a Portuguese long-distance runner. He competed in the men's 5000 metres at the 1984 Summer Olympics.

References

1960 births
Living people
Athletes (track and field) at the 1984 Summer Olympics
Athletes (track and field) at the 1988 Summer Olympics
Portuguese male long-distance runners
Olympic athletes of Portugal
Place of birth missing (living people)